Šimon Hrubec (born June 30, 1991) is a Czech professional ice hockey Goaltender. He is currently playing with ZSC Lions in the National League (NL).

Playing career
Hrubec played with HC České Budějovice in the Czech Extraliga during the 2010–11 Czech Extraliga season. He later joined HC Oceláři Třinec in 2012.

After eight seasons with Oceláři Třinec, Hrubec left the Czech Republic as a free agent. On 14 June 2019, he opted to sign a one-year contract with Chinese club Kunlun Red Star of the KHL.

After ten games with Kunlun into his second season with the club in the 2020–21 campaign, Hrubec was traded to contending Russian club, Avangard Omsk, in exchange for financial compensation on 6 November 2020.

After two highly successful seasons as Avangard's starting goaltender, Hrubec opted to continue his career in Switzerland by joining ZSC Lions of the NL on a two-year contract on 1 June 2022.

Awards and honors

References

External links

1991 births
Living people
Avangard Omsk players
AZ Havířov players
Motor České Budějovice players
Czech ice hockey goaltenders
SK Horácká Slavia Třebíč players
HC Kunlun Red Star players
HC Oceláři Třinec players
Ice hockey players at the 2022 Winter Olympics
Olympic ice hockey players of the Czech Republic
Sportspeople from the South Bohemian Region
People from Vimperk
IHC Písek players
HC Tábor players
ZSC Lions players
Czech expatriate ice hockey players in Russia
Czech expatriate ice hockey players in Switzerland
Expatriate ice hockey players in China
Czech expatriate sportspeople in Canada